The 1931 Texas Tech Matadors football team represented Texas Technological College—now known as Texas Tech University—as an independent during the 1931 college football season. In their second season under head coach Pete Cawthon, the Matadors compiled a 6–3 record and outscored opponents by a combined total of 150 to 66. The team played its home games at Tech Field.

Schedule

References

Texas Tech
Texas Tech Red Raiders football seasons
Texas Tech Matadors football